Archibald Montgomery Low (17 October 1888 – 13 September 1956) developed the first powered drone aircraft. He was an English consulting engineer, research physicist and inventor, and author of more than 40 books.

Low has been called the "father of radio guidance systems" due to his pioneering work on planes, torpedoes boats and guided rockets.  He was a pioneer in many fields though, often leading the way for others, but his lack of discipline meant he hardly ever saw a project through, being easily distracted by new ideas.  If it wasn't for this inability to see things to a conclusion, Low could well have been remembered as one of the great men of science.  Many of his scientific contemporaries disliked him, due in part to his using the title "professor", which he wasn't entitled to do as he didn't occupy an academic chair.  His love of the limelight and publicity probably also added to the dislike.

Low was working on the invention of television before World War I and promoting its development through the 1920s.

Early life

Low was born in Purley, London, the second son of John and Gertrude Low.  His father was an engineer with experience in steam boilers and Low's interest in all things mechanical and scientific was fired by visits to his father's place of work.  The family moved to Erith in Kent when Low was still a baby.  He was sent to Preparatory school at Colet Court when his father moved to Australia as a director of the Paddy Lackey Deep-level Company 
 gold mine. In 1896 Archibald was only 7 when he sailed with his mother, his elder brother and a maiden aunt on the ship Thermopylae to Sydney for a visit. He recalls being amazed to find that telephones were fitted in every house. As a young boy Low was forever experimenting at home, building homemade steam turbines or conducting chemical experiments that brought havoc to his local neighbourhood and caused his parents to receive many complaints about the bangs, smells and gases created by young Archie.

At the age of 11 he was enrolled into St Paul's School, an institution where he didn't fit in, being as he put it "too much of an individual".  One of his classmates for several years was Bernard Montgomery, whom Low recalled as being "rather dull".

Aged 16 Low entered the Central Technical College, an institution far more to his liking, here his abilities really started to show.  Under the guidance of his mentor Professor Ashcroft, Low's mercurial mind was given free rein over many of the scientific disciplines.  During his time at the CTC Low designed a drawing device which he called "The Low flexible and adjustable curve".  This device along with a dotted line pen and a self filling draughtsman's pen were marketed by Thornton's, a renowned instrument maker based in Manchester.  He also spent a year devising and making a selector mechanism which allowed a lever when moved to fall into a pre-selected slot.  It wasn't until 32 years later that pre-selected gears came in, long after Low had originally thought of them.

Early career

Low joined his uncle, Edward Low's engineering firm, Low Accessories and Ignition Company, which at the time was the second oldest engineering firm in the City of London.  Unfortunately the company was in a constant struggle for solvency.  Edward Low did what he could financially to help get his nephew's ideas off the ground, but what was really needed was a rich investor.  During this pre-war period Low was constantly coming up with big new ideas, such as his forced induction engine (which in modern parlance would be called a petrol direct injection engine), which was further developed with the large engine builder F.E. Baker Ltd and exhibited on their stand at the Olympia Motor Cycle Show in November 1912. He also invented gadgets like the whistling egg-boiler which he christened "The Chanticleer".  It went on to sell very well, earning him some much-needed money.  He also experimented with gas turbines, but the alloys available at that time wouldn't stand up to the required heat. A prototype of Low's unique invention, the "petrol direct injection engine", was produced and displayed in 1912.

In May 1914 Low gave the first demonstrations of what was to become television, he called it TeleVista.  The first of these demonstration was given to the Institute of Automobile Engineers. Harry Gordon Selfridge then arranged to included one at the famous Selfridge Store Exhibitions. Reports of these were entitled "Seeing By Wireless".  Low's invention was crude and under-developed but the idea was there. The main deficiency was the selenium cell used for converting light waves into electric impulses, which responded too slowly thus spoiling the effect. The demonstration certainly garnered a lot of media interest with The Times reporting on 30 May; 

On 29 May the Daily Chronicle reported;

Low, of course failed to follow up this early promising work, due in part to his temperamental failings and also of course the outbreak of World War I later that year. Nature commented that the work was overblown in "Sensational paragraphs on seeing by wire". However, a US consular report from London by Deputy Consul General Carl Raymond Loop provided a different story and considerable detail about Low's system. Low finally applied for his "Televista" Patent No. 191,405 for "Improved Apparatus for the Electrical Transmission of Optical Images" in 1917 but its release was delayed (possibly for security reasons). It was finally published in 1923. In this patent A. M. Low states "..I do not confine myself to the use of wires for actually transmitting the current as this may be accomplished by electric radiation."  In 1927 Ronald Frank Tiltman asked Low to write the introduction to his book in which he acknowledged Low's work, referring to Low's various related patents with an apology that they were of "too technical a nature for inclusion". Although it employed an electro-mechanical scanning mechanism, with its matrix detector (camera) and mosaic screen (receiver) it is unlike all of the later intervening systems of the 20th century. In these respects, Low had a digital TV system 80 years before the advent of today's digital TV and deserves his place in the history of television. Furthermore, Carl Loop's report said "the selenium in the transmitting screen may be replaced by any diamagnetic material" and in his patent of 1938 A. M. Low stated "It has also been proposed....... a photo-electric cell embodying a plate coated with a photo-sensitive substance which is subdivided into a number of cells by incising the coating lengthwise and crosswise...", essentially the process used today to create megapixel image sensors.

The Great War

When war broke out, Low joined the military and received officer training.  After a few months he was promoted to captain and seconded to the Royal Flying Corps, the precursor of the RAF.  His brief was to use his civilian research on Televista to remotely control the RFC drone weapons proposed by the Royal Aircraft Factory, so it could be used as a guided missile.  With two other officers (Captain Poole and Lieutenant Bowen) under him, they set to work to see if it were possible.  This project was called "Aerial Target" or AT a misnomer to fool the Germans into thinking it was about building a drone plane to test anti-aircraft capabilities.  After they built a prototype, General Sir David Henderson (director-general of Directorate of Military Aeronautics) ordered that an Experimental Works at Feltham should be created to build the first proper "Aerial Target" complete with explosive warhead.  As head of the Experimental Works, Low was given about 30 picked men, including jewellers, carpenters and aircraftsmen in order to get the pilotless plane built as quickly as possible.  The AT planes were from manufacturers such as Airco, Sopwith Aviation Company and the Royal Aircraft Factory. The de Havilland-designed Airco ATs had their first trial on 21 March 1917 at Upavon Central Flying School near Salisbury Plain, attended by 30–40 allied generals.  The AT was launched from the back of a lorry using compressed air (another first).  Low and his team successfully demonstrated their ability to control the craft before engine failure led to its crash landing. A subsequent trial of the RAF ATs on 6 July 1917 was cut short as an AT had been lost at takeoff. At a later date an electrically driven gyrocompass (yet another first) was added to the plane. In 1918 Low's Feltham Works developed the airborne controlled Royal Navy Distance Control Boats (DCB), a variant of the Coastal Motor Boat.
In 1917 Low and his team also invented the first electrically steered rocket (the world's first wireless, or wire-guided rocket), almost an exact counterpart of the one used by the Germans in 1942 against merchant shipping.  Low's inventions during the war were to a large extent before their time and hence were under-appreciated by the government of the day, although the Germans were well aware of how dangerous his inventions might be. In October 1914 two attempts were made to assassinate him; the first involved shots being fired through his laboratory window in Paul Street; the second attempt was from a visitor with a German accent who came to Low's office and offered him a cigarette, which upon analysis contained enough strychnine chloride to kill.

In 1917 the priority for Low's control system changed; the new imperative being to counter the submarine threat. Low was transferred into the Royal Navy along with Lieutenant Ernest Windsor Bowen to adapt the AT system to control the DCBs but Low still commanded the RFC works at Feltham where the work was carried out. The Feltham guidance system was adopted by the Royal Navy secret D.C.B. Section that was commanded by Eric Gascoigne Robinson VC and was based at Calshot. During 1918, trials and rehearsals controlling Royal Naval boats from RAF aircraft had been completed by the D.C.B. Section and the Admiralty Plans Division had detailed a number of potential targets. On 13th. March.1918 Robinson request 12 sets of the radio guidance equipment be ordered from Feltham. An order for 12 new D.C.B. boats was approved but they were not expected to be ready before the end of 1918. 

Although none of these potential weapons were deployed in the war the pre-dreadnought battleship HMS Agamemnon was converted into a remote control target ship in 1920 and the Feltham "Aerial Target" project was taken up by Royal Aircraft Establishment who tested a series of Royal Aircraft Factory 1917 type AT with a 45 h.p Armstrong Siddeley engines in 1921. Low's principles were adopted by the Air Ministry for the RAE Larynx (from "Long Range Gun with Lynx Engine"), and explosive-laden autopiloted aircraft which was developed by the Royal Aircraft Establishment from 1925 and this drone development work culminated in the fleet of Queen Bee aerial target variants of the de Havilland Tiger Moth of the 1930s.  Further developments continued by the British before and during the Second World War.

During World War II the Germans also made good use of Low's 1918 rocket guidance system and used it as one of the foundations for their guided weapons, the Henschel Hs 293, and Fritz X and for their V1 Doodlebug.

Low could have made a considerable amount of money from these inventions, but his patents couldn't stay in force for the statutory period, as he was in the employment of the War Department everything he invented was as a part of his duties so he couldn't benefit financially from them.

Low was commended for this work by a number of senior officers including Sir David Henderson and Admiral Edward Stafford Fitzherbert. Sir Henry Norman, 1st Baronet a technically competent radio engineer and distinguished politician wrote to Low in March 1918 saying "I know of no man who has more extensive and more profound scientific knowledge, combined with a greater gift on imaginative invention than yourself". res.

Inter-war years

Not long after the war Low started the Low Engineering Company Ltd in association with the Hon. C. N. Bruce (later Lord Aberdare).  The company offices were on Kensington High Street, and Low spent much of his time trying to bring his inventions to fruition.  As usual though he was easily distracted by gadgets that he devised, taking his attention away from the more important work.  One of the better gadgets was a motor scooter that Low invented and manufactured in conjunction with Henry Norman.

In 1926, Low was reported to be working with Ivor Halstead, editor of the Daily Sketch, on the script of a film to be called Cosmos, about the history of the world from the beginning of time. 

Despite his best efforts, business wasn't his strong point.  An example of this is the magazine he started up with his friend Lord Brabazon and others. It was entitled Armchair Science, Low helped edit it, and at one point the sales were 80,000 a month, yet it never seemed to make a profit and was sold off. Another of Low's delights was speed, especially racing cars or motorbikes.  He was a regular attendee at Brooklands and at one point invented a rocket propelled bike and numerous other gadgets and improvements for the internal combustion engine. An example of Low's prescience is that he was worried about the number of road traffic accidents that were occurring and believed speed in cities should be restricted to 25 mph using modern radio methods to enforce it. One of Low's peeves was excess noise, to this end he invented an audiometer to measure and record noise in a visual form. He conducted experiments on the London Underground and achieved some success in pinpointing trouble spots and reducing their impact by use of shields over the wheels and padding of the interior panels.

In 1938 Low had lunch with a gentleman called William Joyce. Joyce wanted Low to contribute an article to a paper he helped run.  Low declined the offer being too busy; it was only a couple of years later that Joyce gained infamy as Lord Haw-Haw.

A few of Low's inventions from this period are:

Using infra-red photography to check head space in engines;
A machine for reproducing photographs by radio;
An audiometer that was a forerunner of sound photography at high speed (used in engineering and architectural work);
A device for converting ordinary print to Braille using photo electric cells;
Cap-detonating sparkplug.

Second World War and later

At the outbreak of the Second World War Low initially joined the Air Ministry in a civil capacity.  His job was to examine captured German aircraft and prepare reports for British pilots to enable them to identify the weak points of the enemy aircraft.  Later on he joined the Royal Pioneer Corps and was promoted to major.  Between experiments in his back garden laboratory, he gave frequent talks to service personnel on scientific matters.  Low was frequently in bad health from the late 1930s onwards, having never fully recovered from a bout of pneumonia he suffered a few years earlier.  Although nothing that he experimented with during the war ultimately came to fruition, he did work on some interesting projects:

The 'W' bomb – a riverine mine for Operation Royal Marine being designed by MD1. It floated just beneath the surface, came up when needed and spread a kind of umbrella out of itself which would detonate when touched. The primary inventors were Millis Jefferis and Stuart Macrae; the latter was formerly an editor of Armchair Science with whom Low was on friendly terms.
A bomb that when dropped on airfields would be buried to the hilt but leave trailing wires on the surface.  An aircraft touching these wires would detonate the bomb.
A notable humanitarian example involved the incorporation of a flap on a carrier pigeon's cage secured by sugar so that if the pigeon was trapped after a crash or incident moisture would soak into the sugar and release the bird.

Quotations

Later life
Low died at his London home in 1956 aged 68. The cause of his death was a malignant tumour on his lung.  He is buried in Brompton Cemetery, London.

In 1976 Low was inducted into the International Space Hall of Fame

Works

Low was a prolific author of science books.  He aimed several of his books at the layman to try to nurture interest in science and engineering.  Quite a few of his books contained predictions on scientific advancements.
 
As well as these non-fiction books he wrote four science fiction novels for the younger reader.

Non-fiction

The Two Stroke Engine: A Manual of the Coming Form of the Internal Combustion Engine (1916)
Wireless Possibilities (1924)
The Future (1925)
Tendencies of Modern Science (1930)
On My Travels(1930)
The Wonder Book of Inventions (1930)
Popular Scientific Recreations (1933)
Science in Wonderland (1935)
Recent Inventions (1935)
Great Scientific Achievements (1936)
Conquering Space and Time (1937)
Life and its Story (1937)
Home Experiments (1937)
Electrical Inventions (1937)
Science for the Home (1938)
What New Wonders! (1938)
Science in Industry (1939)
Modern Armaments (1939)
How We find Out (1940)
Mine and Countermine (1940)
The Way it Works (1940)
The Submarine at War (1941)
Romance of Fire (1941)
Science Looks ahead (1942)
Tanks (1942)
Musket to Machine-Gun (1942)
Facts and Fancies (1942)
Parachutes in Peace and War (1942)
Benefits of War (1943)
Tick-Tock (1944)
Six Scientific Years (1946)
How Secrets Work (1946)
Your World Tomorrow (1947)
They Made Your World (1949)
Look, Listen and Touch (1949)
It's Bound to Happen (1950)
The Past Presented (1952)
Electronics Everywhere (1952)
Wonderful Wembley Stadium (1953)
Thanks to Inventors (1954)

Fiction

Peter Down the Well (1933)
Adrift in the Stratosphere (1937)
Mars Breaks Through, or The Great Murchison Mystery
Satellite in Space (1956)

Appointments

Associate of the City and Guilds of London Institute
Member of the Institute of Mechanical Engineers
Fellow of the Chemical Society
Fellow and President of the British Institute for Radio Engineers
Chairman for 24 years of the AutoCycle Union
President for 32 years (1925-1956) of the South Eastern Centre of the AutoCycle Union
Chairman of the RAC Motor Cycle Committee
Honorary technical advisor to the Women's Automobile and Sports Association1929
Vice-chairman and chairman for 20 years of the British Automobile Racing Club
Fellow of the Royal Geographical Society
Principal of the British Institute of Engineering Technology
Fellow of the Institute of Electronics
One of the founder members, and 2nd President (1936–1951) of the British Interplanetary Society
Associated Hon. Asst, Professor of Physics at the Royal Ordnance College, by the Army Council
Membership of the Magic Circle from 5 September 1950

Recognition
In 1976 Low was included in the 35 pioneers listed by the International Academy of Astronautics and inducted into the International Space Hall of Fame in 1976. He has been called the "Father of Radio Guidance Systems" and the "founder of the field of radio guidance systems".  Alternatively,  it was suggest A. M. Low was the "Father of Remotely Piloted Vehicles".

Notes

References

Low's patents
Low's bibliography at Copac.
Low's bibliography at WorldCat.

External links

 

IWM catalogue. For example, the Aerial Target Model can be found at Q 68008 Other images are Q 66031, Q 67984 to Q 67991, Q 68002 to Q 68012, Q 68036 to Q 68040, Q 66711, Q 69509, Q 69929, Q 69930 and H 10307.

1888 births
1956 deaths
English physicists
Royal Flying Corps officers
Royal Pioneer Corps officers
English science writers
English science fiction writers
Television pioneers
Futurologists
People from Purley, London
Burials at Brompton Cemetery
People educated at St Paul's School, London
20th-century British novelists
20th-century British inventors
English male novelists
20th-century British engineers
20th-century English male writers
Radio-controlled aircraft
History of television